Dave Stroud is an American vocal coach, vocal educator, and lecturer who has worked with Justin Bieber, Justin Timberlake, Arnel Pineda, Billy Crystal, Mike Posner, Natasha Bedingfield, Demi Lovato, Michael Jackson, and Kelly Clarkson, among others.  He was commissioned by American Idol for seasons 6, 8, 9, 10, and 11 as a vocal teacher for touring idols Adam Lambert, Jordin Sparks, Allison Iraheta, David Cook, Lee DeWyze, Lauren Alaina, Scotty McCreery, and others. Stroud is the former CEO of Seth Riggs' SLS (speech level singing) vocal teaching program and played a major role in developing the teaching platform internationally. In 2010 he launched VocalizeU to establish his own vocal coaching program.

Early life
In 1989 Stroud owned DV8, a dance nightclub in Salt Lake City, Utah.  The club was modeled after dance clubs that Stroud had frequented in Los Angeles. In 1990 Stroud moved to San Francisco and began studying with Seth Riggs with whom he would develop and implement a teaching and marketing business model that expanded Riggs' teaching program internationally.  In 1998 he oversaw the production of When You Believe (written by Narada Michael Walden), recorded by over 60 singers including Claytoven Richardson and Penny Framstad, and was produced by Geoff Grace.  The song shared similarities to We are the World and received a fair amount of airplay.

Career
Dave Stroud is a vocal coach, vocal educator, and lecturer who has shared his expertise through his master-classes internationally including Australia, Austria, Germany, France, the UK, Mexico, China, Singapore, Korea, and Japan, among others.  He has worked with Natasha Bedingfield, Martina McBride, Justin Bieber, Kelly Clarkson, One Direction, Terry Ellis, Daniel Bedingfield, Michael Jackson ("This is it" tour), and others. Stroud was the owner and publisher of, Connecting Voices, a magazine for singers.

 VocalizeU
In 2010 Stroud founded and launched, VocalizeU teaching privately as well as producing Winter Songwriting Retreats in the San Bernardino Mountains to focus on artists' identity, vocal development, creativity, and songwriting skills. In July 2012, Stroud's company produced VocalizeU Summer Intensive, a yearly 10-day artist intensive focusing on vocals, songwriting, stage presence, and music production at Mount Saint Mary's University, Los Angeles. Music industry professionals and Grammy award-winning music producers are brought in to share their knowledge and experience with 300 students.

 American Idol
Stroud was commissioned by American Idol as a vocal coach to work with touring idols in Seasons 6, 8, 9, 10, and 11 working with Adam Lambert, Jordin Sparks, Allison Iraheta, David Cook, Lee DeWyze, Lauren Alaina, Scotty McCreery, and others. He continues to provide vocal support for American Idol and 19 Management regularly.  In an interview with Backstage Magazine, Stroud shared insights working with Adam Lambert, "Adam can do extreme things with his voice that most singers will probably never be able to do. The fact is Adam is so amazing that he doesn't have to overdo it. I work with the music director to look at the peaks, where they happen in the show, and where he can recover from that"

 SLS (Speech-Level Singing)
Stroud is the former CEO of Seth Riggs' SLS organization. A then-longtime student and friend of Seth Riggs, Stroud formulated criteria to uphold the integrity of teaching Speech-Level Singing internationally. It was Riggs who created the exercises that blended singers' head voice and chest voice while applying SLS (speech level singing) techniques that benefited Prince, Stevie Wonder, Madonna, Barbra Streisand, and numerous others. In 1995 Stroud developed a teaching platform, which was implemented in 2000, which required all of SLS's vocal teachers to undergo lessons and testing from one or more of seven SLS master classes and would be tested and approved if they were to be associated with Seth Riggs.

References

Voice teachers
American vocal coaches
Living people
Year of birth missing (living people)